Shanmukha Priya (born 2 November 2002) is an Indian singer, who specializes in the carnatic music, jazz, rock, pop and yodeling. She has appeared on numerous popular reality television shows, including Padutha Theeyaga S6 (2013), Sa Re Ga Ma Pa L'il Champs 2017 (2017) and Indian Idol 12 (2020–21).

Early life and career 
Shanmukha Priya was born in Visakhapatnam, India into a Telugu-speaking family. Her mother Ratnamala is a music teacher and her father Srinivas Kumar is an instrumentalist of Veena, Violin, Guitar, Mandolin and Keyboard. The Hindu reported that when she was three years old her father first heard her humming to the tune played on an alarm clock. He instantly took out the veena and gave her the notes and rhythm. She performed well with her vocals and then started her training in the carnatic music.

At the age of 6, she made her debut in the reality singing in 2008 with the TV show Sa Re Ga Ma Pa L'il Champs 2008 on Zee Telugu. Her next show Padutha Theeyaga, which was judged by S. P. Balasubrahmanyam was her major breakthrough. Following the success on the television, she became a playback singer and recorded a song for the 2010 Telugu film Tejam.

Later, she appeared in five television singing shows, of which two are in Telugu, two are in Hindi and one in Tamil. Her performance in Indian Idol 12 made her widely popular. After watching her jazz-style performance to the song  "Jaane Tu Mera Kya Hai" from the film Jaane Tu... Ya Jaane Na (2008) on the show, A. R. Rahman praised her and termed her as the next ‘Jazz Star of India’. In contrast, her yodeling-style of singing is often criticized and trolled by the audience. This criticism is mostly for her own style of singing various songs in Indian Idol 12.

Discography

As playback singer

Filmography

Television

References 

2002 births
Living people
People from Visakhapatnam
Sa Re Ga Ma Pa participants
Indian Idol participants
Indian women singers
Indian women jazz singers
21st-century Indian singers
Women Carnatic singers
Carnatic singers
Singers from Andhra Pradesh
Telugu playback singers